Sodium periodate is an inorganic salt, composed of a sodium cation and the periodate anion. It may also be regarded as the sodium salt of periodic acid. Like many periodates, it can exist in two different forms: sodium metaperiodate (formula‍ NaIO4) and sodium orthoperiodate (normally Na2H3IO6, but sometimes the fully reacted salt Na5IO6). Both salts are useful oxidising agents.

Preparation
Classically, periodate was most commonly produced in the form of sodium hydrogen periodate. This is commercially available, but can also be produced by the oxidation of iodates with chlorine and sodium hydroxide. Or, similarly, from iodides by oxidation with bromine and sodium hydroxide:

\overset{sodium\ iodate}{NaIO3} + Cl2{} + 4 NaOH -> Na3H2IO6{} + 2NaCl{} + H2O
NaI + 4 Br2 + 10 NaOH -> Na3H2IO6 + 8 NaBr + 4 H2O

Modern industrial scale production involves the electrochemical oxidation of iodates, on a lead dioxide anode, with the following standard electrode potential:

H5IO6 + H+ + 2e- -> IO3- + 3 H2O

Sodium metaperiodate can be prepared by the dehydration of sodium hydrogen periodate with nitric acid.

Na3H2IO6 + 2 HNO3 -> NaIO4 + 2 NaNO3 + 2 H2O

Structure
Sodium metaperiodate (NaIO4) forms tetragonal crystals (space group I41/a) consisting of slightly distorted  ions with average I–O bond distances of 1.775 Å; the Na+ ions are surrounded by 8 oxygen atoms at distances of 2.54 and 2.60 Å.

Sodium hydrogen periodate (Na2H3IO6) forms orthorhombic crystals (space group Pnnm). Iodine and sodium atoms are both surrounded by an octahedral arrangement of 6 oxygen atoms; however the NaO6 octahedron is strongly distorted. IO6 and NaO6 groups are linked via common vertices and edges.

Powder diffraction indicates that Na5IO6 crystallises in the monoclinic system (space group C2/m).

Uses

Sodium periodate can be used in solution to open saccharide rings between vicinal diols leaving two aldehyde groups. This process is often used in labeling saccharides with fluorescent molecules or other tags such as biotin. Because the process requires vicinal diols, periodate oxidation is often used to selectively label the 3′-ends of RNA (ribose has vicinal diols) instead of DNA as deoxyribose does not have vicinal diols.

NaIO4 is used in organic chemistry to cleave diols to produce two aldehydes.

In 2013 the US Army announced that it would replace environmentally harmful chemicals barium nitrate and potassium perchlorate with sodium metaperiodate for use in their tracer ammunition.

See also
 lead tetraacetate - also effective for diol cleavage via the Criegee oxidation

References

See Fatiadi, Synthesis (1974) 229–272 for a review of periodate chemistry.

Periodates
Sodium compounds
Oxidizing agents